Saʿd al-Din al-Humaidi or al-Humaydi was a 13th-century Kurdish Ayyubid governor of Baalbek. He was appointed by as-Salih Ayyub after the 1246 conquest of the territory following a year-long siege after the death of its former lord, as-Salih Ismail.

References

Citations

Bibliography
 . 
 .

13th-century Kurdish people
13th-century Ayyubid rulers
Kurdish rulers
13th-century Syrian people